Uhler is a surname. Notable people with the surname include:

 Caroline Uhler (born 1983), Swiss statistician
 Maury Uhler (1886–1918), American Major League Baseball player
 Philip Reese Uhler (1835–1913), American librarian and entomologist
 Ruth Pershing Uhler (1895–1967), American painter